Tomasi Alosio Logotuli (born 26 January 1992) is a Samoan rugby union player who plays for  in Super Rugby and  in the Bunnings NPC. His position is wing or fullback.

Career
He was named in the Moana Pasifika squad for the 2022 Super Rugby Pacific season. 

He also represented  in the 2015 ITM Cup and the 2021 Bunnings NPC. 

Alosio is a Samoa international having made his debut in 2021 against Tonga, having previously represented Samoa at rugby sevens, playing over 200 games between 2015 and 2020.

Alosio was named in the Tasman Mako squad for the 2022 Bunnings NPC.

Reference list

External links
itsrugby.co.uk profile

1992 births
Samoan rugby union players
Samoa international rugby union players
Living people
Rugby union wings
Rugby union fullbacks
Wellington rugby union players
Moana Pasifika players
Tasman rugby union players